Bârza is a commune in Olt County, Oltenia, Romania. It is composed of two villages, Bârza and Braneț.

Natives
 Pan M. Vizirescu

References

Communes in Olt County
Localities in Oltenia